Freefall (sometimes known simply as Tunnels 3) is the second sequel to the book Tunnels, and is the third book in the series by Roderick Gordon and Brian Williams. Contrary to a number of erroneous comments in the media, Freefall was not the final novel in the Tunnels series, and the fourth book, Closer, was published by Chicken House in the UK on 3 May 2010.

 Freefall picks up the story where the second book left off, and describes the events after Will Burrows, Chester Rawls, Elliott, and Bartleby have plummeted down a huge opening in the Deeps, finding themselves at an even greater depth in the Earth. As the story unfolds, Will and his father, Dr. Burrows, discover a way back to Topsoil and return to Highfield, a new character, Martha, is introduced, and there are two major confrontations with the Rebecca twins, the main antagonists of the series.

Plot summary
Closer, Further (Part 1)

The opening chapter describes how Chester Rawls is the first to regain consciousness on a fungal shelf deep down in the Pore where he, Will Burrows, Elliott and Bartleby have crash landed. After Will has located his brother’s dead body and given him a burial of sorts, he and Chester carry the injured Elliott with them as they set about exploring this alien and frightening world. The task of moving through the passages with the burden of Elliott and their equipment is made easier thanks to the reduced gravity at this depth in the Earth.

With the help of Bartleby’s tracking ability, they discover that there is someone else down there with them, but are attacked by giant carnivorous creatures called spider-monkeys. They are saved by the intervention of a new character called Martha. She takes them to where she lives, a shack evidently built by the survivors of a galleon which was sucked down another of the giant holes like the Pore, so she can tend to Elliott and protect the two boys.

Meanwhile, the Rebecca twins, who were pushed into the Pore by Sarah Jerome in her last dying act, are aware that Will is alive, and begin to plot against him with two Styx Special Forces soldiers, called Limiters. One of the Rebeccas and a Limiter approach Will's father, Dr. Burrows, and attempt to bully him into finding them a way out of the Pore. Dr. Burrows seems to have very little comprehension that the Styx are dangerous and capable of great cruelty and murder.

Martha's Shack (Part 2)

At Martha’s shack, Elliott’s condition deteriorates as she catches a voracious fever, and Martha warns Will and Chester that her son died after the same thing happened when he injured himself on an expedition two years previously. Much to Will’s surprise, the other Rebecca twin turns up alone at the shack, and her life is only spared after Will stops Chester and Martha from killing her. The twin claims that she is innocent and has had to go along with her sister’s evil plans. Will appears to give her the benefit of the doubt, but Chester and Martha are highly skeptical.  Will is further won over by the Rebecca twin as she gives him two phials, which purportedly contain the Dominion virus and its antidote.

Elliott’s condition worsens, and Will and Chester discover that Martha has been less than honest with them, and that there may be a source of modern medicines to help the girl. Although Martha is reluctant for them to risk the long journey, she eventually leads them to a "metal ship" which her son had stumbled across.

The Metal Ship (Part 3)

When they get there, it turns out that the metal ship is actually a modern Russian nuclear submarine, and they are forced to shelter inside it while Elliott responds to the antibiotics. There is also the added risk that they may be attacked by "Brights", giant moth like flying creatures.

As they finally set off from the submarine, the second Rebecca twin makes her appearance with Dr. Burrows and the two Limiters. Will realizes the twin who surrendered to him has been lying all the time, as she orders Bartleby to attack him – the Hunter has been conditioned to follow her orders after being Darklit in the Colony. One of the Limiters is killed by a "Bright", but the Rebeccas still have an edge. Just when it appears as if all is lost, Elliott reveals that she is half Styx, and saves the day by priming one of the explosives from her rucksack. In the subsequent explosion, Will and his father are separated from Chester, Elliott, Martha and Bartleby, while the Rebecca twins and the surviving Limiter seek refuge in the Russian submarine, which is knocked down the giant hole it was in by the explosion.

The Underground Harbour (Part 4)

Separated from his friends and not knowing whether they are alive or not, Will is persuaded by his father to travel upwards, and they stumble upon an underground harbour, a deep-level fallout shelter from the Cold War. After Will has helped himself to various weapons from the armoury in the shelter, they manage to get an outboard engine to work, and attach it to a launch. Then they travel up a subterranean river linking the fallout shelter to the surface, and emerge in Norfolk, from where they make their way back to Highfield, and are reunited with Drake.

Highfield, Again (Part 5)

Mrs. Burrows, Will’s stepmother, has gone through a transformation after she manages to beat her TV addiction, and has returned to Highfield where she is kept under close surveillance by the Styx and their agents. At Dr. Burrows’ insistence, Drake takes him to meet his wife, so revealing to the Styx that Dr. Burrows and Will are back Topsoil. Then there follows a parting of the ways as Mrs. Burrows remains on the surface with Drake, who has asked Will to return into the Earth and make sure that the risk of the Dominion virus has been neutralised.

Departure (Part 6)

Drake, with help from a squad of former SAS soldiers, devises a plan to trap one of the leading Styx, the "old Styx", using Mrs. Burrows as bait. But the mission fails and Mrs. Burrows is captured and taken to the Colony where she is Darklit (being cast by Styx by the Dark Light). Meanwhile, Will is accompanied by his father as they retrace their route to where the submarine was blasted from the ledge in the giant hole Will has named "Smoking Jean", and he is reunited with Chester, Martha, and a fully recovered Elliott. Dr. Burrows, in a literal leap of faith, throws himself into the pore, followed by his son, and eventually by Elliott and Bartleby. Dr. Burrows’ assumption that the gravity further down the pore is progressively lower is proved to be correct, and after locating the submarine, they search for any surviving Styx. Dr. Burrows, driven by his conviction that there is a world at the centre of the Earth, risks all their lives as he makes sure that they have no option but to continue towards it.

They finally make it through to the "Garden of the Second Sun" - a hidden world at the center of the Earth, complete with its own sun, mountains, oceans, and animals long since extinct on the surface. Assisted by Will, Dr. Burrows begins to investigate one of three Mayan-type pyramids they find there, and it seems as though they are finally safe from the Styx until Elliott spots some footprints. She, Will and Bartleby follow the trail and discover that the Rebecca twins and a Limiter have also made it through to the hidden world.

After Elliott sets an ambush to deal with the Styx for once and for all, Will disobeys her and sneaks in to retrieve the Dominion phials. He is discovered by one of the Rebecca twins, and in the firefight and explosion which follow, both the Rebecca twins and Limiter perish, while Will makes off with the phials. Far from being angry at his disobedience, Will’s reward is a kiss on the cheek from Elliott. It seems as though Will’s prayers have been answered as he embarks upon his new life in this idyllic world, with Elliott as his companion and working with his father to discover incredible secrets from the past, until one day Dr. Burrows spots a WW2 German bomber, a Stuka, in the sky.

Publication history
Freefall was released on 4 May 2009 in the U.K. and was released in the U.S. on 1 February 2010. The fourth book in the series, Closer, was released on 3 May 2010 (U.K. paperback).

References

External links
Tunnels Books Series Official Website
Tunnels Series UK Official Fansite
Roderick Gordon's Official Website

2009 British novels
2009 science fiction novels
British science fiction novels
British young adult novels
Children's science fiction novels
Hollow Earth in fiction
Lost world novels
Nazi fugitives in popular culture
Novels set in subterranea
The Chicken House books